Atari 2600 Action Pack is a compilation of 15 of Activitision's own Atari 2600 games published by Activision for Macintosh and Microsoft Windows in 1995. It includes Boxing, Chopper Command, Crackpots, Fishing Derby, Freeway, Frostbite, Grand Prix, H.E.R.O., Kaboom!, Pitfall!, River Raid, Seaquest, Sky Jinks, and Spider Fighter.

Reception
Next Generation reviewed the PC version of the game, rating it two stars out of five, and stated that "while it sounds like a lot of fun, most of these games are a lot more inane than you remember them being. [...] The Atari Action Pack is a useful reminder that not all of the oldies are worth playing again. You've come a long way, baby."

Next Generation reviewed the Macintosh version of the game, rating it one star out of five, and stated that "These games are simple, they're no-frills, and some of them are still fun... for about five minutes After that point, nostalgia had better keep you awake buddy-san because these Jurassic turds won't."

Reviews
 PC Gamer (May 1995)
 PC Player (April 1995)
 All Game Guide (1998)
 Computer Games Magazine (March 15, 1997)

References

1995 video games
Activision video game compilations
Classic Mac OS games
Video games developed in the United States
Windows games